Tre kronor, Swedish "Three crowns", may refer to:
Three Crowns, a national emblem of Sweden
Sweden men's national ice hockey team, which has the Swedish national emblem on its jersey
Tre Kronor (castle), a 16th-century royal castle in Stockholm, Sweden
, a Swedish Navy ship
Tre kronor (TV series)